Mustapha Begga (10 June 1934) was a professional Algerian footballer who played as a defender.

Honour

Career statistics

Club

References

1934 births
Algerian footballers
USM Blida players
Association football defenders
Living people
People from Blida
21st-century Algerian people